David Miramant (born May 22, 1955) is an American Democratic politician and pilot from Maine. He represents Senate District 12, Knox County, in the Maine Senate. Miramant served in the Maine House of Representatives from 2006-2008 and was first elected to the Senate in 2014. Miramant is a career pilot: He flew commercial Boeing 767s at Delta Air Lines and has owned and operated a glider ride service on coastal Maine since 2005.

Early life and education
Miramant's father served in the Air Force and the family traveled frequently when Miramant was a child. He attended Bedford High School outside of Boston from 1969-1973 and became active politically during the civil rights movement and the Vietnam War.

Miramant attended the University of Maine at Farmington from 1975-1980 and completed a Bachelor of Arts in biology.  He received his airline transport pilot licence, qualified as a captain on the Boeing 767 and flew for Delta Air Lines. He has also owned and operated several small business, including a hotel, restaurants, and a flying service, and worked as a boat captain.

Political career
Miramant served on the Camden, Maine Select Board from 2000-2003 and was on the budget and personnel committees. He was elected to the Maine House of Representatives in 2006 to represent Camden and Rockport and served one term until 2008 when he unsuccessfully challenged incumbent Chris Rector for the Senate District 22 seat.

In February 2014, Miramant announced that he would seek to replace the retiring Edward Mazurek for the renamed Senate District 12. He ran unopposed in the Democratic primary and defeated Republican Paula Sutton 52%-48% in the general election.

In the 2020 Senate District 12 general election, Miramant defeated Republican Gordon Page 58%-42%. In December 2020, he was appointed Senate chair of the Marine Resources Committee and also sat on the Labor and Housing Committee. As of March 2021, Miramant is a member of the Coastal Caucus and a commissioner on the Atlantic States Marine Fisheries Commission. In March 2021, he was appointed to the Coastal and Marine working group of the Maine Climate Council.

Personal life
Miramant has been married to Dee Webster since 1980 and they have two adult children. Miramant has owned and operated Spirit Soaring Glider Rides out of Owls Head, Maine since 2005.

Electoral record

References

External links
Senator Dave Miramant: Official Site
Maine State Legislature: Sen. David Miramant
Senator Dave Miramant on Facebook
Spirit Soaring Glider Rides
2021 Free Press op ed: Sen. Dave Miramant: Reviewing the Pine Tree Amendment

1955 births
Living people
People from Camden, Maine
University of Maine at Farmington alumni
Democratic Party members of the Maine House of Representatives
21st-century American politicians
Democratic Party Maine state senators